Atergatis is a genus of crabs in the family Xanthidae, containing the following species:

 Atergatis dentatus De Haan, 1835
 Atergatis dilatatus De Haan, 1835
 Atergatis floridus (Linnaeus, 1767)
 Atergatis granulatus De Haan, 1889
 Atergatis integerrimus (Lamarck, 1818)
 Atergatis interruptus Takeda & Marumara, 1997
 Atergatis laevigatus A. Milne Edwards, 1865
 Atergatis latissimus (H. Milne Edwards, 1834)
 Atergatis montrouzieri A. Milne Edwards, 1873
 Atergatis nitidus A. Milne Edwards, 1865
 Atergatis ocyroe (Herbst, 1801)
 Atergatis obtusus A. Milne Edwards, 1865
 Atergatis reticulatus (De Haan, 1835)
 Atergatis roseus (Ruppell, 1830)
 Atergatis subdentatus (De Haan, 1835)
 Atergatis tweediei Ward, 1934

Six species are known from the fossil record, including three which are extinct.

References

Xanthoidea
Crustacean genera